The Kanab Hotel and Cafe, located at 19 W. Center St. in Kanab, Utah, was built in 1929.  It was listed on the National Register of Historic Places in 2003, by which time it had also been known as Virge's Kanab Hotel, Cafe and Bakery.

It is a brick two-part commercial block building on a concrete foundation, with a flat roof behind a "cascading" parapet.  It has one-story later additions on its north and east sides.

References

Commercial buildings on the National Register of Historic Places in Utah
Early Commercial architecture in the United States
Buildings and structures completed in 1929
Kane County, Utah
Hotel buildings on the National Register of Historic Places in Utah